The Rukarara River (or Lukarara) is a river in western Rwanda that is a tributary of the Mwogo River, in turn a tributary of the Nyabarongo River.
It is the most distant headwater of the Nile.

Sources
The Rukarara rises in forested country in southern Rwanda to the east of the Congo-Nile Divide.
The Kamiranzovu Swamp in the Nyungwe Forest Reserve provides a natural reservoir for the Rukarara.
The source of the Rukarara is now known to be the overall source of the Nile.
This was confirmed by a 2005/2006 expedition up the river with modern navigation equipment. 

Course

The Rukarara has its sources in the Nyamagabe District. 
The Nyirabugoyi and Rubyiro rivers are its main headwaters, both rising in the Nyungwe National Park. 
The Rukarara is the longest of the streams that supply the Mwogo.
The Rukarara flows south and then east, emptying into the Mwogo River. The Mwogo flows north, merging with the Mbirurume River south of Bwakira to become  the Nyabarongo River.

References

Sources

 

Rivers of Rwanda